The 1972 Masters Tournament was the 36th Masters Tournament, held April 6–9 at Augusta National Golf Club in Augusta, Georgia.

Jack Nicklaus opened with a 68 and led wire-to-wire to win the fourth of his six Masters titles, three strokes ahead of three runners-up. It was the tenth of 18 major titles as a professional for Nicklaus, who also won the U.S. Open in 1972 and was the runner-up at the Open Championship in Scotland, one stroke behind Lee Trevino.

It was the first Masters played without founder Bobby Jones, who died in December 1971 at age 69. This Masters was also the debut of twenty-year-old Ben Crenshaw of the University of Texas, a future two-time champion who was low amateur at 295 (T19).

Banned from the last five Masters, commentator Jack Whitaker returned to the CBS telecast in 1972. At the end of the 18-hole Monday playoff in 1966, he had referred to the portion of the gallery trailing the players as a "mob."

Nicklaus became the third wire-to-wire winner in Masters history, following Craig Wood in 1941 and Arnold Palmer in 1960.  Through 2016, there have been five; the next were Raymond Floyd in 1976 and Jordan Spieth in 2015.

Field
1. Masters champions
George Archer (9,11), Billy Casper (8,10,11,12), Charles Coody (8,12), Doug Ford, Bob Goalby (11), Ralph Guldahl, Herman Keiser, Jack Nicklaus (2,3,4,8,9,10,11,12), Arnold Palmer (8,11,12), Gary Player (3,8,10,11), Gene Sarazen, Sam Snead, Art Wall Jr.
Gay Brewer (9), Jack Burke Jr., Jimmy Demaret, Claude Harmon, Ben Hogan, Cary Middlecoff, Byron Nelson and Henry Picard did not play. Brewer was hospitalized in Augusta for ulcers on Wednesday night and missed the tournament.

The following categories only apply to Americans

2. U.S. Open champions (last five years)
Orville Moody (8), Lee Trevino (3,9,11,12)

3. The Open champions (last five years)

4. PGA champions (last five years)
Julius Boros, Raymond Floyd (8,9), Don January (8), Dave Stockton (8,11,12)

5. The first eight finishers in the 1971 U.S. Amateur
Rick Bendall (a), Ben Crenshaw (a), Tom Culligan (a), Vinny Giles (7,a), Jim McLean (a), Eddie Pearce (a), Marty West (a)

6. Previous two U.S. Amateur and Amateur championsSteve Melnyk (7,8) and Lanny Wadkins (7,9) forfeited their exemptions by turning professional but qualified in other categories.7. Members of the 1971 U.S. Walker Cup team
William C. Campbell (a), John Farquhar (a), Jim Gabrielsen (a), Bill Hyndman (a), Tom Kite (a), Jim Simons (9,a)Allen Miller forfeited his exemption by turning professional.8. Top 24 players and ties from the 1971 Masters Tournament
Tommy Aaron, Frank Beard (11,12), Dave Eichelberger (11), Al Geiberger, Bert Greene, Hale Irwin (11), Dick Lotz, Steve Melnyk, Johnny Miller (9,11), Bobby Mitchell (11), Bob Murphy, Ken Still, Tom Weiskopf (11)Gene Littler (11,12) had been diagnosed with cancer and did not play.9. Top 16 players and ties from the 1971 U.S. Open
Jim Colbert, Jerry Heard (11), Larry Hinson, Jerry McGee, Bobby Nichols, Chi-Chi Rodríguez, Bob Rosburg (11), Lanny Wadkins, Bert Yancey

10. Top eight players and ties from 1971 PGA Championship
Miller Barber (11,12), Tommy Bolt, Gibby Gilbert, Dave Hill, Jim Jamieson

11. Winners of PGA Tour events since the previous Masters
Homero Blancas, Gardner Dickinson (12), Hubert Green, Paul Harney, Labron Harris Jr., Grier Jones, DeWitt Weaver

12. Members of the U.S. 1971 Ryder Cup team
Mason Rudolph, J. C. Snead

13. Foreign invitations
Harry Bannerman, Brian Barnes, Bob Charles (9), Bobby Cole (9), Gary Cowan (5,6,a), Bruce Crampton (8,11), Roberto De Vicenzo (3,8), Bruce Devlin (8), David Graham, Hsieh Yung-yo, Tony Jacklin (2,3,11), Takaaki Kono, Lu Liang-Huan, Peter Oosterhuis, Masashi Ozaki, Ramón SotaNumbers in brackets indicate categories that the player would have qualified under had they been American.Round summaries

First roundThursday, April 6, 1972Source

Second roundFriday, April 7, 1972Source

Third roundSaturday, April 8, 1972Source

Final roundSunday, April 9, 1972Final leaderboard

Sources:

ScorecardCumulative tournament scores, relative to par''

References

External links
Masters.com – past winners and results
Augusta.com – 1972 Masters leaderboard and scorecards

1972
1972 in golf
1972 in American sports
1972 in sports in Georgia (U.S. state)
April 1972 sports events in the United States